Pesvarus is a monotypic genus of centipedes in the family Scutigeridae. It is endemic to Australia, with the type locality being Yalgoo in south-west Western Australia. It was described by M. Würmli in 1974. Its sole species is Pesvarus pachypus Würmli, 1974.

References

 

Scutigeridae
Centipede genera
Monotypic arthropod genera
Centipedes of Australia
Animals described in 1974
Fauna of Western Australia